The 1975–76 American Basketball Association season saw the demise of the Baltimore Claws franchise.

Offseason

Draft picks

Preseason transactions

On August 27, 1975, the Memphis Sounds franchise was dismantled and sold to a group of Baltimore businessmen headed by David Cohan.  The franchise moved to Baltimore.  It was first called the Baltimore Hustlers but the league objected to the name so the team was quickly rechristened as the Baltimore Claws.

On September 19, 1975, the Claws obtained star center Dan Issel from the Kentucky Colonels, the team that won the 1975 ABA Championship.

The Claws also traded guard Rick Mount to the Utah Stars for guards Joe Hamilton and Tim VanBlommesteyn.

The Claws signed Skip Wise, the 6'3" star guard from Clemson University who the prior year became the first freshman ever to be named First Team All-ACC while averaging 18.9 points per game.

Preseason exhibition games

The Claws played their first game, a preseason exhibition, in Salisbury, Maryland, on October 9, 1975, against the Virginia Squires.  The Squires won 131–121; attendance was reported at 1,150.

Two days later the Claws lost to the NBA's Philadelphia 76ers 103–82 in Cherry Hill, New Jersey.

On October 17, 1975, the Claws played the Squires again, this time at Knott Arena, Mt. St. Mary's College, Emmitsburg, Maryland.  The Squires won 100–88 in front of approximately 500 spectators. http://www.remembertheaba.com/Baltimore-Claws.html

Demise

The Claws only managed to sign up 300 season ticket holders.  The franchise constantly had money problems.  On October 16, 1975 ABA Commissioner Dave DeBusschere gave the Claws four days to send $500,000 to the ABA league office as a "performance bond" for team operations.  While their players went unpaid, the Claws sent $250,000 of this amount.  On October 20, 1975, five days before the start of the 1975–76 regular season, the ABA folded the Baltimore Claws.

Regular season

The Claws folded prior to the start of the regular season.

Roster

 George Carter
 Mel Daniels
 Scott English
 Joe Hamilton
 Stew Johnson
 Bob Rhodes
 Dave Robisch
 Skip Rozenski
 Paul Ruffner
 Ron Styles
 Claude Terry
 Tim VanBlommesteyn
 Chuck Williams
 Skip Wise

The above would have been the Baltimore Claws' regular season roster had the team continued into regular season play.

Season standings

Player statistics

Legend

Season

Playoffs

Awards and records

Awards

Records

Transactions

Draft and preseason signings

Signed Skip Wise of Clemson University to a five-year, $1,000,000 contract

Drafted:
 Lonnie Shelton (stayed in college)
 Rich Kelley (signed with NBA's New Orleans Jazz)
 Terry Furlow (stayed in college)

Trades

 September 19, 1975: traded Tom Owens and $500,000 cash to the Kentucky Colonels for Dan Issel
 September 1975: traded Dan Issel to the Denver Nuggets for Dave Robisch and $500,000 cash
 Traded Rick Mount to the Utah Stars for Joe Hamilton and Tim VanBlommesteyn

Dispersal draft:

 Alex English (Indiana Pacers)
 Joe Hamilton (Utah Stars)
 Stew Johnson (San Diego Sails)
 Dave Robisch (Spirits of St. Louis)
 Paul Ruffner (Spirits of St. Louis)
 Claude Terry (Denver Nuggets)
 Chuck Williams (Virginia Squires)

External links

RememberTheABA.com Baltimore Claws page

Baltimore Claws
Baltimore Claws
1975 in sports in Maryland
1976 in sports in Maryland